Jack Sock was the defending champion but chose not to defend his title.

Jason Kubler won the title after defeating Wu Tung-lin 6–0, 6–2 in the final.

Seeds

Draw

Finals

Top half

Bottom half

References

External links
Main draw
Qualifying draw

Little Rock Challenger - 1
Little Rock Challenger